CRS-1 may refer to:

Cisco CRS-1, a family of Cisco's Carrier Routing System
SpaceX CRS-1, flight for SpaceX's uncrewed Dragon cargo spacecraft
Cygnus CRS-1, flight for Orbital Sciences Cygnus cargo spacecraft
Commercial Resupply Services — Phase 1 Missions of NASA

See also
 CRS (disambiguation)